Thomas Hull may refer to:

Thomas Hull (actor) (1728–1808), English actor and dramatist
Thomas Hull (MP) (1528–1575/1576), English politician
Thomas E. Hull, builder of El Rancho Vegas hotel and casino
Thomas Gray Hull (1926–2008), American judge
Tom Hull (American football) (born 1952), American football linebacker

Tom Hull (critic) (born 1950), American music critic and software designer
Tom Hull (mathematician), American mathematician who studies paper folding
Kid Harpoon, stage name of Tom Hull (born 1982), English singer-songwriter